The Harry W. Jones House is a historic house in Minneapolis, Minnesota, United States, in the Tangletown neighborhood.  Harry Wild Jones was one of the most notable architects in Minneapolis, with a career spanning nearly 50 years.  His designs included the Butler Brothers Warehouse, the chapel in Lakewood Cemetery, and the Washburn Park Water Tower.  His own home, built in 1887, was one of the first homes in the Washburn Park area and influenced the design of other homes in the area.  The house is listed on the National Register of Historic Places.

References

1887 establishments in Minnesota
Houses completed in 1887
Houses in Minneapolis
Houses on the National Register of Historic Places in Minnesota
National Register of Historic Places in Minneapolis